Tri-Cities Airport may refer to:

 Tri-Cities Airport (New York) in Endicott, New York, United States (FAA: CZG)
 Tri-Cities Airport (Washington) in Pasco, Washington, United States (FAA/IATA: PSC)
 Tri-Cities Airport (Blountville, TN) Johnson City, Kingsport, Bristol Tennessee/Virginia, United States (FAA/IATA: TRI)

See also
 Tri-City Airport (disambiguation)